The Basilica of St. Michael the Archangel in Pensacola, Florida, United States is a minor basilica of the Catholic Church in the Diocese of Pensacola-Tallahassee. St. Michael's parish was established in 1781 and the present Gothic Revival-style church building was dedicated in 1886.  In recognition of its historic significance the church was elevated to a Basilica in 2011 by Pope Benedict XVI.

References

Basilica churches in Florida
Roman Catholic Diocese of Pensacola–Tallahassee
Roman Catholic churches in Pensacola, Florida
Roman Catholic churches in Florida
Gothic Revival church buildings in Florida
Roman Catholic churches completed in 1886
19th-century Roman Catholic church buildings in the United States
Churches in Escambia County, Florida